Samo Khae is a subdistrict in the Mueang Phitsanulok District of Phitsanulok Province, Thailand. In 2019 it had a population of 16,056 and 8,472 households. In this subdistrict is a private university.

Geography
The topography of Samo Khae is fertile lowlands with an area of 40.19 km2 and lies east of the Nan river.  The subdistrict is bordered to the north by Don Thong subdistrict, to the east by Wang Thong subdistrict of Wang Thong district, to the south by Wang Phikun subdistrict of Wang Thong district, and to the west by Aranyik subdistrict and Hua Ro subdistrict. Samo Khae subdistrict lies in the Nan Basin, which is part of the Chao Phraya Watershed.

History
Originally, Samo Khae subdistrict was divided into five administrative villages: Moo1 Ban Nong Tho, Moo2 Ban Ladlak Bua Khao, Moo3 Ban Dong Pradok-Krommethan, Moo4 Ban Samo Khae and Moo5 Ban Go. In 1998, Ban Noen Makhuek (Moo6) was separated from Ban Ladlak Bua Khao (Moo2); Ban Phong Sathon-Chinlap (Moo7) and Ban Krommethan-Chatkaew (Moo8) were split from Ban Dong Pradok-Krommethan (Moo3).Samo Khae Subdistrict Administrative Organization-SAO (ongkan borihan suan tambon) was established, published 19 January 1996 in Royal Thai Government Gazette, but effective 30 March 1996.

Administration
The administration of Samo Khae SAO is responsible for an area that covers 40.19 km2 and consists of eight administrative villages, as of 2019: 16,056 people and 8,471 households.

Administrative villages contain many villages such as:
 M004 - Montha Thong
 Moo7 - Indochina View Point, Prueksa Thara and Supaporn Resort 2
 Moo8 - Mae Thorani Thong and Rim Sowan

Logo
The Samo Khae SAO (Thai: อบต - oh boh toh) logo shows an anchor (solidarity), a rope (unity) and a moon (prosperity).

Temples
Samo Khae subdistrict is home to the following active temples, where Theravada Buddhism is practiced by local residents: 

In Samo Khae subdistrict (Moo1) there is a Chinese shrine to worship Guan Yu.
:File:Guan Yu Shrine001, Phitsanulok.jpg

Economy
ฺBecause the land is suitable for agriculture, most people work in this sector. The following companies also play a role in the employment service: CPF factory, Kaset Phattana Industry, Makro Phitsanulok 2 and Thai Watsadu Phitsanulok.

Government institutions
The following government institutions in Samo Khae subdistrict are:
Phitsanulok Provincial Administrative Organization (PPAO) - Moo4. 
Phitsanulok Provincial Industrial Office - Moo4. 
Provincial Electricity Authority (PEA) area 2 - Moo7.
King Baromma Trailokkanat Camp (Royal Thai Army) - Moo2.
Highway Police Station 3 Division 5 - Moo4.

Infrastructure

Education

Higher education
Phitsanulok University is a private university - Moo5. 
Faculty of Business and Accountancy
Faculty of Law
Faculty of Liberal Arts and Education
Faculty of Public Administration
Faculty of Public Health

Primary/secondary education
New Cambridge International school - Moo3. 
Teeratada Phitsanulok school - Moo3. 
Wat Krommethan school - Moo3.
Wat Si Wanaram school - Moo3.
Wat Samo Khae school - Moo4.
Wat Noen Makhuek school - Moo6.

Child development center
Samo Khae SAO child development center.
Noen Makhuek child development center.

Healthcare
There is Samo Khae health-promoting hospital in Ban Dong Pradok (Moo3).

Transportation

Roads
Major roads are:
Highway 11, Phitsanulok-Uttaradit route.
Highway 12, Phitsanulok-Lom Sak route.
Bypass road 126, northern ring road of Phitsanulok, starts at junction CP.
Bypass road 126, southern ring road of Phitsanulok, starts at intersection Indochina (old name Rong Pho).Because the intersection Indochina is a transportation hub in the connection between Myanmar-Thailand-Laos-Vietnam, East-West-Economic Corridor (EWEC), it was expanded in 2019 with a flyover and a roundabout to avoid a waiting time of three minutes at traffic lights.

Buses and taxis
From bus station no.2 buses provide mass transport through Phitsanulok province. Connection to Bangkok and cities of northern Thailand (except Mae Hong Son province) and northern northeastern Thailand is via direct bus routes daily and at night. All these bus routes are offered by eight bus companies, such as Esantour, Kingdom tour, Nakhonchai Air, Phet Prasert, Sombat tour and Win Tour Phitsanulok. Phet Prasert also has direct bus lines to eastern Thailand (Pattaya and Chanthaburi). Piya Chai Pattana offers a direct bus line to the south of Thailand (Hat Yai, Ko Samui, Phang Nga, Phuket and Surat Thani).There are taxis with the necessary meters; motorcycle taxis and tuk-tuk tricycle taxis with negotiated rates.

Electricity
All households in Samo Khae subdistrict have access to the electricity network.

Communications
80 percent of all households in Samo Khae subdistrict have access to the fixed and mobile telephone network.

Waterworks
Provincial Waterworks Authority (PWA) is not cooperating to provide information on the number of households that have access to their water network in Samo Khae subdistrict.

Culture
Watthanathai-Yuan (thai:ว้ฒนธรรมไท-ยวน) is a culture conservation center of Thai-Yuan club in Moo3. The purpose is to preserve maintain customs, arts, culture and local wisdom with the Samo Khae subdistrict.

References

Tambon of Phitsanulok province
Populated places in Phitsanulok province